BXB is the IATA code for Babo Airport, Indonesia

BxB or BXB may refer to:

Broxbourne railway station, Hertfordshire, National Rail station code
BxB Hulk, Japanese wrestler
BxB Brothers, manga series
BxB Dating sim games